Kevin Ian "Kip" Pardue (born September 23, 1975) is an American actor and model, who became known for his roles in the films Remember the Titans, But I'm a Cheerleader, The Rules of Attraction and Thirteen.

Early life and education
Born in Atlanta, Georgia, Pardue attended Dunwoody High School, where he played defensive back for the football team. Pardue was co-captain of Dunwoody's 1993  Georgia Class AAAA state football championship team. He also played center field for Dunwoody's baseball team.  The name "Kip" comes from the initials of his full name. Pardue earned a Bachelor of Arts degree in economics from Yale University, where he played football.

Career 
After graduating from college, Pardue was discovered by Molly Ringwald's publicist. He has been a model for Armani, Polo and Abercrombie and Fitch. He was named as one of the "Top 10 Upcoming Actors" by Armani Exchange in 2001.

On October 31, 2018, the Hermosa Beach Police Department announced it was investigating a report of sexual misconduct filed by actress and intimacy coordinator Sarah Scott, who alleged she was "sexually violated while at work" in May by Pardue, her former costar. On July 7, 2019, SAG-AFTRA, a labor union, fined him $6,000 for sexually harassing Scott.

Filmography

Awards and nominations

References

External links
 

Living people
1976 births
American male film actors
Male models from Georgia (U.S. state)
American male television actors
Male actors from Atlanta
Yale University alumni
Yale Bulldogs football players
20th-century American male actors
21st-century American male actors
Dunwoody High School alumni